The following elections occurred in 2017.

Africa
2017 Somali presidential election 8 February 2017
2017 Gambian parliamentary election 6 April 2017
2017 Algerian legislative election 4 May 2017
2017 Lesotho general election 3 June 2017
2017 Republic of the Congo parliamentary election 16 and 30 July 2017
2017 Saint Helena general election 26 July 2017
2017 Senegalese parliamentary election 30 July 2017
2017 Rwandan presidential election 4 August 2017
2017 Kenyan general election 8 August 2017
2017 Angolan legislative election 23 August 2017
2017 Liberian general election 10 October and 26 December 2017
2017 Kenyan presidential election 26 October 2017
2017 Equatorial Guinean legislative election 12 November 2017
2017 Somaliland presidential election 13 November 2017

Asia
Japan: 2017 Yamagata gubernatorial election 22 January 2017
Japan: 2017 Gifu gubernatorial election 29 January 2017
India: 2017 Goa Legislative Assembly election 4 February 2017
India: 2017 Punjab Legislative Assembly election 4 February 2017
India: 2017 Uttar Pradesh Legislative Assembly election 11 February 2017 – 8 March 2017
2017 Turkmen presidential election 12 February 2017
India: 2017 Uttarakhand Legislative Assembly election 15 February 2017
2017 Indonesian local elections 15 February 2017
2017 Jakarta gubernatorial election 15 February and 19 April 2017
Malaysia: 2017 Tanjong Datu by-election 18 February 2017
India: 2017 Manipur Legislative Assembly election 4 and 8 March 2017
2017 East Timorese presidential election 20 March 2017
Japan: 2017 Chiba gubernatorial election 23 March 2017
China: 2017 Hong Kong Chief Executive election 26 March 2017
2017 Myanmar by-elections 1 April 2017
Japan: 2017 Akita gubernatorial election 9 April 2017
2017 South Korean presidential election 9 May 2017
2017 Nepalese local elections 14 May, 28 June and 18 September 2017
2017 Cambodian communal elections 4 June 2017
Japan: 2017 Shizuoka gubernatorial election 25 June 2017
Japan: 2017 Shizuoka Prefectural Assembly by-elections 25 June 2017
2017 Mongolian presidential election 26 June and 7 July 2017
Japan: 2017 Hyōgo prefectural gubernatorial election 2 July 2017
Japan: 2017 Tatsuno and Ibo District by-election 2 July 2017
Japan: 2017 Tokyo prefectural election 2 July 2017
2017 Indian presidential election 17 July 2017
2017 East Timorese parliamentary election 22 July 2017
Japan: 2017 Ibaraki gubernatorial election 27 August 2017
China: 2017 Macanese legislative election 17 September 2017
2017 Singaporean presidential election 23 September 2017 (sole candidate acclaimed as President-elect)
13th National People's Congress October 2017
2017 Kyrgyz presidential election 15 October 2017
2017 Japanese general election 22 October 2017
Japan: 2017 Miyagi gubernatorial election 22 October 2017
India: 2017 Himachal Pradesh Legislative Assembly election 9 November 2017
Japan: 2017 Hiroshima gubernatorial election 12 November 2017
2017 Nepalese legislative election 26 November and 7 December 2017
India: 2017 Gujarat Legislative Assembly election 9 and 14 December 2017

Middle East
2017 Iranian local elections 19 May 2017
2017 Iranian presidential election 19 May 2017

Europe
2017 Liechtenstein general election 5 February 2017
2017 German presidential election 12 February 2017
United Kingdom: 2017 Copeland by-election 23 February 2017
United Kingdom: 2017 Stoke-on-Trent Central by-election 23 February 2017
United Kingdom: 2017 Northern Ireland Assembly election 2 March 2017
2017 Abkhazian parliamentary election 12 and 26 March 2017
2017 Hungarian presidential election 13 March 2017
2017 Dutch general election 15 March 2017
2017 Bulgarian parliamentary election 26 March 2017
Germany: 2017 Saarland state election 26 March 2017
2017 Armenian parliamentary election 2 April 2017
2017 Serbian presidential election 2 April 2017
2017 Finnish municipal elections 9 April 2017
2017 South Ossetian presidential election 9 April 2017
2017 Albanian presidential election 19, 20, 27 and 28 April 2017
2017 French presidential election 23 April and 7 May 2017
2017 United Kingdom local elections 4 May 2017
United Kingdom: 2017 Manchester Gorton by-election 4 May 2017 (cancelled)
Germany: 2017 Schleswig-Holstein state election 7 May 2017
Germany: 2017 North Rhine-Westphalia state election 14 May 2017
2017 Croatian local elections 28 May and 4 June 2017
2017 Maltese general election 3 June 2017
2017 Latvian municipal elections 4 June 2017
2017 United Kingdom general election 8 June 2017
2017 French legislative election 11 and 18 June 2017
2017 Italian local elections 11 and 25 June 2017
2017 Kosovan parliamentary election 11 June 2017
2017 Albanian parliamentary election 25 June 2017
2017 Russian gubernatorial elections 10 September 2017
2017 Russian regional elections 10 September 2017
Russia: 2017 Bryansk by-election 10 September 2017
Russia: 2017 Kingisepp by-election 10 September 2017
2017 Norwegian parliamentary election 11 September 2017
2017 French Senate election 24 September 2017
2017 German federal election 24 September 2017
2017 Portuguese local election 1 October 2017
2017 Luxembourg communal elections 8 October 2017
2017 Austrian legislative election 15 October 2017
2017 Estonian municipal elections 15 October 2017
Germany: 2017 Lower Saxony state election 15 October 2017
2017 Macedonian local elections 15 and 29 October 2017
2017 Czech legislative election 20–21 October 2017
2017 Georgian local elections 21 October 2017
2017 Kosovan local elections 22 October and 18 November 2017
2017 Slovenian presidential election 22 October and 12 November 2017
2017 Icelandic parliamentary election 28 October 2017
2017 Slovak regional elections 4 November 2017
Italy: 2017 Sicilian regional election 5 November 2017
2017 Danish local elections 21 November 2017
France: 2017 Corsican territorial election 3 and 10 December 2017
Spain: 2017 Catalan regional election 21 December 2017

North America
 2017 United States elections
France: 2017 Saint Pierre and Miquelon legislative election 19 March 2017
 Canada: Calgary Heritage by-election, 2017 3 April 2017
 Canada: Calgary Midnapore by-election, 2017 3 April 2017
 Canada: Markham—Thornhill by-election, 2017 3 April 2017
 Canada: Ottawa—Vanier by-election, 2017 3 April 2017
 Canada: Saint-Laurent by-election, 2017 3 April 2017
 Canada: 2017 British Columbia general election 9 May 2017
 Canada: 2017 Nova Scotia general election 30 May 2017
 2017 Mexican gubernatorial elections 4 June 2017
 2017 Bermudian general election 18 July 2017
 2017 Honduran general election 26 November 2017

Caribbean
2016–17 Haitian Senate election 20 November 2016 and 29 January 2017
France: 2017 Saint Barthélemy Territorial Council election 19 March 2017
France: 2017 Saint Martin Territorial Council election 19 March 2017
Netherlands: 2017 Curaçao general election 28 April 2017
2017 Bahamian general election 10 May 2017
2017 Caymanian general election 24 May 2017

Oceania
 2017 Marshallese Constitutional Convention election 21 February 2017
 New Zealand: 2017 Mount Albert by-election 25 February 2017
 2017 Micronesian parliamentary election 7 March 2017
 Australia: 2017 Western Australian state election 11 March 2017
France: 2017 Wallis and Futuna Territorial Assembly election 26 March 2017
 Australia: 2017 Gosford state by-election 8 April 2017
 Australia: 2017 Manly state by-election 8 April 2017
 Australia: 2017 North Shore state by-election 8 April 2017
 Australia: 2017 Tasmanian Legislative Council periodic elections 6 May 2017
 2017 Niuean general election 6 May 2017
 2017 Papua New Guinean general election 24 June–8 July 2017
 2017 Vanuatuan presidential elections 3 July 2017
 2017 New Zealand general election 23 September 2017
 Australia: 2017 Blacktown state by-election 14 October 2017
 Australia: 2017 Cootamundra state by-election 14 October 2017
 Australia: 2017 Murray state by-election 14 October 2017
 Australia: 2017 Pembroke state by-election 4 November 2017
 2017 Tongan general election 16 November 2017
 Australia: 2017 Northcote state by-election 18 November 2017
 Australia: 2017 Queensland state election 25 November 2017
 Australia: 2017 New England by-election 2 December 2017
 Australia: 2017 Bennelong by-election 16 December 2017

South America
 2017 Argentine provincial elections
 2017 Ecuadorian general election 19 February and 2 April 2017
 2017 Venezuelan Constituent Assembly election 30 July 2017
 Brazil: 2017 Amazonas gubernatorial election 6 and 27 August 2017
 2017 Venezuelan regional elections 15 October 2017
 2017 Argentine legislative election 22 October 2017
 2017 Falkland Islands general election 9 November 2017
 2017 Chilean general election 19 November and 17 December 2017
 2017 Venezuelan municipal elections 10 December 2017

See also
 Local electoral calendar 2017
 National electoral calendar 2017
 Supranational electoral calendar 2017

 
2017
Elections